In Greek mythology, Ida or Ide (Ancient Greek: Ἴδη, Idē, 'wooded mountain') was one of the nurses of the infant Zeus on Crete.

Mythology 
According to Apollodorus, Rhea gave the infant Zeus to the nymphs Adrasteia and Ida, daughters of Melisseus, to nurse, and they fed Zeus on the milk of the goat Amalthea. According to Hyginus, Ida and Adrasteia (along with Amalthea) were daughters of Oceanus, whom "others say they were the daughters of Melisseus". She was associated with the Cretan Mount Ida.

According to the second-century geographer Pausanias, Ida was represented, on the altar of Athena Alea at Tegea. Ida was one of eight nymphs on either side of the central figures of Rhea and the nymph Oenoe holding the infant Zeus. On one side were Glauce, Neda, Theisoa and Anthracia, and on the other Ida, Hagno, Alcinoe and Phrixa.

According to Diodorus Siculus, Zeus rewarded Ida and Adrasteia by turning them into the constellations of Ursa Major and Ursa Minor.

Notes

References
 Apollodorus, Apollodorus, The Library, with an English Translation by Sir James George Frazer, F.B.A., F.R.S. in 2 Volumes. Cambridge, MA, Harvard University Press; London, William Heinemann Ltd. 1921.  Online version at the Perseus Digital Library.
 Diodorus Siculus, Library of History, Volume III: Books 4.59-8, translated by C. H. Oldfather, Loeb Classical Library No. 340. Cambridge, Massachusetts, Harvard University Press, 1939. . Online version at Harvard University Press. Online version by Bill Thayer. Online version at ToposText.
 Gantz, Timothy, Early Greek Myth: A Guide to Literary and Artistic Sources, Johns Hopkins University Press, 1996, Two volumes:  (Vol. 1),  (Vol. 2).
 Grimal, Pierre, The Dictionary of Classical Mythology, Wiley-Blackwell, 1996, .
 Graves, Robert, The Greek Myths: The Complete and Definitive Edition. Penguin Books Limited. 2017. 
Hard, Robin, The Routledge Handbook of Greek Mythology: Based on H.J. Rose's "Handbook of Greek Mythology", Psychology Press, 2004, .
 Hyginus, Gaius Julius, Fabulae in Apollodorus' Library and Hyginus' Fabulae: Two Handbooks of Greek Mythology, Translated, with Introductions by R. Scott Smith and Stephen M. Trzaskoma, Hackett Publishing Company,  2007. .
 Larson, Jennifer, "Greek Nymphs : Myth, Cult, Lore", Oxford University Press (US). June 2001. .
 Kern, Otto. Orphicorum Fragmenta, Berlin, 1922. Internet Archive
 Pausanias, Pausanias Description of Greece with an English Translation by W.H.S. Jones, Litt.D., and H.A. Ormerod, M.A., in 4 Volumes. Cambridge, MA, Harvard University Press; London, William Heinemann Ltd. 1918. Online version at the Perseus Digital Library.
 Tripp, Edward, Crowell's Handbook of Classical Mythology, Thomas Y. Crowell Co; First edition (June 1970). .

Oceanids
Cretan characters in Greek mythology